"What About Us" is a song written by Jerry Leiber and Mike Stoller and performed by The Coasters. In the US, the song reached #17 on the R&B chart and #47 on the Billboard Hot 100 in 1959. The song appeared on their 1962 album, Coast Along.

The song was produced by Jerry Leiber, Mike Stoller.

Other versions
The Undertakers released the song as a single in 1963 in the United Kingdom.

References

1959 songs
1959 singles
1963 singles
Songs written by Jerry Leiber and Mike Stoller
The Coasters songs
Atco Records singles
Pye Records singles